Giuseppe "Toni" Mascolo  (6 May 1942 – 10 December 2017) was an Italian-born British hairdresser and businessman, and the co-founder of hairdressing chain Toni & Guy with his brother Gaetano "Guy" Mascolo.

Early life
He was the eldest of five sons of Francesco Mascolo, who ran a barber shop and hair salon in Scafati, Campania, southern Italy, and his wife Maria Mascolo (née Gallo).

Career
In 1963, Toni Mascolo and his brother Guy opened their first salon in Clapham, London.

By 2000, there were 112 salons, 27 of them outside the UK.

Mascolo was the chief executive until his death in 2017.

Personal life
In 1970, he married Pauline O'Donnell, who had started working for them as an assistant in 1963. They had three children - Sasha and Christian run the company, and Pierre is a film producer.

Honours
In 2008, Mascolo was appointed an Honorary Officer of the Order of the British Empire (OBE) for services to hairdressing.

References

1942 births
2017 deaths
British hairdressers
British company founders
Italian emigrants to the United Kingdom
Honorary Officers of the Order of the British Empire
Naturalised citizens of the United Kingdom
People from the Province of Salerno